Getting It in the Street is the third and final release by David Cassidy on RCA Records. This would also be the last album David  released in the United States until 1990 (with the release of David Cassidy) and his last all new album until 1985 (with the release of Romance).  Gettin' It in the Street was released in Germany and Japan in November 1976, but did not reach the album charts. The few copies that were pressed for the U.S. were released in July 1979.

Rocker Mick Ronson played lead guitar on the title track which was released as a single. It reached number 105 in the Billboard "Bubbling Under" chart and climbed to number seven in the weekly Top 20 compiled by readers of the German teen magazine Bravo. The album was not an official release by the record company and is very hard to find. Some tracks from this album are compiled on the 1996 collection, When I'm a Rock 'n' Roll Star.

The track "Cruise To Harlem" was co-written by former (founding) Beach Boys member, Brian Wilson, and America member, Gerry Beckley.

Track listing
 "Gettin' It in the Street" (David Cassidy, Gerry Beckley)
 "I'll Have To Go Away (Saying Goodbye)" (Renee Armand, Kerry Chanter)
 "I Never Saw You Coming" (David Cassidy, Jay Gruska)
 "Rosa's Cantina" (David Cassidy, Bryan Garofalo)
 "Junked Heart Blues" (David Cassidy)
 "Cruise To Harlem" (David Cassidy, Gerry Beckley, Brian Wilson)
 "The Story of Rock and Roll" (Harry Nilsson)
 "Living a Lie" (David Cassidy, Gerry Beckley)
 "Love, Love The Lady" (David Cassidy, Gerry Beckley)

References

David Cassidy albums
1976 albums
RCA Records albums